Harry F. Dunkel (May 14, 1898 – May 4, 1990) was an American lawyer and politician from New York.

Life
He was born on May 14, 1898, in Fulton County, New York. He attended the public schools in Gloversville. He graduated from Albany Law School, and practiced law in Gloversville. He was Clerk of the Board of Supervisors of Fulton County from 1926 to 1931.

Dunkel was a member of the New York State Assembly (Fulton and Hamilton Co.) in 1932, 1933, 1934 and 1935.

He was a member of the New York State Senate (35th D.) from 1936 to 1938, sitting in the 159th, 160th and 161st New York State Legislatures.

Later he was at times County Attorney of Hamilton County, and Town Attorney of Lake Pleasant.

He died on May 4, 1990.

Sources

1898 births
1990 deaths
Republican Party New York (state) state senators
Republican Party members of the New York State Assembly
People from Gloversville, New York
Albany Law School alumni
20th-century American politicians